Admiral Leonard Andrew Boyd Donaldson,  (1 August 1875 – 28 June 1956) was a Royal Navy officer who served as Director of Torpedoes and Mining from 1922 to 1924, and as Admiral-Superintendent of Portsmouth dockyard from 1927 to 1931.

Biography
Donaldson was born in 1875, and joined the Royal Navy.

During World War I he served in various commands in charge of submarine flotillas. Following the war, he was Director of Torpedoes and Mining at the Admiralty from 1922 to 1924.

In July 1924 he was appointed Captain-Superintendent of Pembroke Dockyard, serving until its closure in May 1926. The following year he was appointed Admiral-superintendent of Portsmouth dockyard, serving as such for four years.

He was promoted to admiral on the Retired list on 8 May 1935.

References

1875 births
1956 deaths
Royal Navy admirals